Jamie Woon (born 29 March 1983) is a British singer, songwriter, and record producer signed to PMR Records. He gained widespread acclaim in 2010 for his single "Night Air", which was co-produced by Burial, following his previous independent release, the Wayfaring Stranger EP.

Biography 
The son of a Malaysian Chinese father, and Scottish mother, Celtic singer Mae McKenna, who also has Irish ancestry. He was born and raised in New Malden in the Royal Borough of Kingston upon Thames, Greater London, before his parents divorced. He was educated at Sacred Heart RC Primary School (New Malden), S.T Catherines RC Middle School (Raynes Park) and Wimbledon College (Wimbledon). He later attended the BRIT School, where he graduated the year behind Amy Winehouse, whom he later supported live.

Woon's sound and style is described as soul inflected vocals backed by samplers and programming, or a single guitar track. He describes his music as "... R&B, it's groove-based vocal-led music ..."

On 4 January 2011, the BBC announced that Woon had been placed fourth in the BBC's Sound of 2011 poll.

Woon's debut album is entitled Mirrorwriting and was released on 18 April 2011 via Polydor Records.

On 1 May 2012, Woon announced that he had to cancel several upcoming shows due to an injury. Since then, there had been a lull in his activities but in March 2015, he did a collaboration with Portico for their new album Living Fields to be released in April the same year.

In August 2015, a new single, "Sharpness", was released. Benji B revealed in his show on 13 August, that the new album would be called Making Time. It was subsequently released in September the same year.

Discography

Studio albums

Extended plays

Singles

Music videos

Other appearances

Remixes

Awards and nominations

References

External links
Official website

Jamie Woon on VEVO

English male singers
English soul singers
English pop guitarists
English male guitarists
Post-dubstep musicians
People educated at the BRIT School
People from New Malden
English people of Malaysian descent
English people of Chinese descent
English people of Irish descent
English people of Scottish descent
1983 births
Living people
21st-century English singers
21st-century British guitarists
21st-century British male singers